Little Down (or Littledown) is a village in Hampshire, England, on the North Downs near the county boundaries with Berkshire and Wiltshire. It lies just north of Vernham Street village, in Vernham Dean civil parish.

Its nearest town is Andover, approximately 7.5 miles (12 km) south from the village.

References

Villages in Hampshire
Test Valley